The Ommelanden are the parts of Groningen province that surround Groningen city. Usually mentioned as synonym for the province in the expression  ("city and surrounding lands").

The area was Frisian-speaking, but under the influence of the Saxon city of Groningen most of the area turned to speaking Low Saxon. A reminder of the Frisian past is the Ommelanden flag which looks a lot like the Frisian provincial flag but has more and narrower stripes and more red  (stylised heart-shaped leaves of yellow water-lily).

The area is made up of the following four quarters:
 Westerkwartier
 Hunsingo
 Fivelingo with Oldambt
 Westerwolde

References

External links 
Medieval Germany
Burge's Commentaries on Colonial and Foreign Laws
Approaches to Old Frisian Philology

Regions of Groningen (province)
Regions of the Netherlands